Desmiphora travassosi is a species of beetle in the family Cerambycidae. It was described by Mendes in 1938. It is known from Brazil.

References

Desmiphora
Beetles described in 1938